The Buru–Sula languages are a group of Austronesian languages (geographically Central–Eastern Malayo-Polynesian languages) spoken on the Buru and Sula Islands in the eastern Moluccas. Buru itself has almost forty thousand speakers, and Sula about twenty thousand.

Classification
The languages are:
Buru: Buru, Lisela, Palumata (extinct), Moksela (extinct)
Sula: Sula, Mangole

Another extinct Buru language is the fragmentarily attested Hukumina language.

The Taliabo languages (Kadai, Padang/Samala, Mananga, Mangei/Soboyo) were once included, but turn out to be Celebic.

References

Languages of Indonesia
Central Maluku languages